The smalleye squaretail, Tetragonurus cuvieri, is a squaretail of the genus Tetragonurus found in all tropical and temperate oceans of the world, at depths up to 800 m.  Its length is 20 to 70 cm.

References

 
 Tony Ayling & Geoffrey Cox, Collins Guide to the Sea Fishes of New Zealand, (William Collins Publishers Ltd, Auckland, New Zealand 1982) 

Tetragonuridae
Fish described in 1810